The following is a list of characters from the DreamWorks animated film media franchise Kung Fu Panda. The franchise includes a film trilogy (Kung Fu Panda, Kung Fu Panda 2, and Kung Fu Panda 3), a series of shorts and television specials, three television shows (Kung Fu Panda: Legends of Awesomeness, Kung Fu Panda: The Paws of Destiny and Kung Fu Panda: The Dragon Knight), a series of digital comics, and multiple video games.

Protagonists

Master Ping Xiao Po (also known as Po)

Master Ping Xiao Po (voiced by Jack Black, Mick Wingert, and Eric Loomis) is the main protagonist of the Kung Fu Panda franchise. A kung fu fan and giant panda working at his adoptive father's noodle restaurant, Po is chosen by Grand Master Oogway as the legendary Dragon Warrior, a decision that angers Shifu and the Furious Five. When Tai Lung escapes from prison, Shifu uses food to motivate Po into mastering kung fu. He defeats Tai Lung in combat and is declared a master.

In Kung Fu Panda 2, Po learns that he was adopted by Ping as a baby (voiced by Liam Knight) after Lord Shen committed genocide against the giant pandas. The end of the film reveals that Po's biological father Li Shan is still alive, and he reunites with his son in Kung Fu Panda 3. When the undead warrior Kai steals the chi of the other kung fu masters, Po and Li create an army from the remaining giant pandas. After defeating Kai, Po has a spiritual reunion with Oogway, who informs Po that his journey as the Dragon Warrior has come full circle. He returns to the mortal world with his extended family.

Kung Fu Panda: Legends of Awesomeness, which occurs between the first and second film, shows Po's greater development as a kung fu warrior and master after defeating Tai Lung, while the follow-up series, Kung Fu Panda: The Paws of Destiny, takes place after the events of the third film and shows Po in a mentor role to four young pandas. Kung Fu Panda: The Dragon Knight, also takes place after the events of the third film and shows Po in a journey to protect four legendary and powerful weapons from a pair of English weasel magicians who intend to use them to take over the world. Po also appears in all short films and specials, as well as the video games.

Master Shifu
Master Shifu (voiced by Dustin Hoffman in the films and TV specials and Fred Tatasciore in the TV series and video games) is a red panda, the headmaster of the Jade Palace, and the trainer of the Furious Five. He joined the palace when his father, the con artist Shirong, abandoned him there. Later in life, Shifu adopted Tai Lung, and he did not acknowledge his own role in the snow leopard's turn to evil until after Po was deemed the Dragon Warrior. Although Shifu initially doubts Po's potential in kung fu, he later trains Po to help him defeat Tai Lung and become a kung fu master.

After Tai Lung's defeat, Shifu becomes a more relaxed master to Po and the Five. By the time of the third film, he has retired from active teaching in order to focus on learning how to use chi, and he passes on the instructor mantle to Po. When Kai attacks the Jade Palace, Shifu is turned into a jade soldier and a member of Kai's army, but he is returned to normal when Po destroys Kai in the Spirit Realm.

Grand Master Oogway
Grand Master Oogway (voiced by Randall Duk Kim in the film and Legends of Awesomeness, Greg Baldwin in the video games, and Piotr Michael in The Paws of Destiny), was an elderly Galápagos Tortoise, the senior headmaster of the Jade Palace before Shifu, and the creator of kung fu. Highly venerated for his wisdom, knowledge, and experience, Oogway was considered by many to be a sage. He was known as the greatest kung fu master in history, with no other reputation surpassing his. In the first film he is the one to choose Po as the Dragon Warrior,  much to everyone's surprise, and his warmth and acceptance of Po serve as a foil to the strict and abrasive Shifu. He ascends to the Spirit Realm in the first film, but appears in flashback cameos in the second.

In the third film, while meditating in the Spirit Realm, Oogway is attacked by his former friend, Kai, who steals his chi and escapes the realm. After Po defeats Kai, he meets Oogway in the Spirit Realm, where Oogway explains to Po that on the first day they met, he saw both the future of kung fu in Po, as well as the past.  He sensed that Po would be the one to unite them both and become his true successor. He then presents Po with his staff,  to which he was hesitant to accept, before Po returns to the mortal realm.

Furious Five
The Furious Five are the supporting protagonists of the Kung Fu Panda franchise. The most skilled warriors in China, they are homages to the Five Animals Southern styles of Chinese martial arts: crane, viper, monkey, mantis, and tiger. While the Five initially dismissed Po as the Dragon Warrior, they grow to respect his courage and tenacity. In the Kung Fu Panda: Legends of Awesomeness episode "Owl Be Back," it is revealed that a previous incarnation of the Five existed, made up of Shifu, Fenghuang, Master Rooster, Master Snow Leopard, and Master Elephant.

Master Tigress
Master Tigress (voiced by Angelina Jolie in the films and Kari Wahlgren in Legends of Awesomeness) is a South China tiger and the leader of the Furious Five. She was initially the most resentful of Po when he was chosen to be the Dragon Warrior instead of her, and the most vocal in her contempt. When Tigress overheard Po telling Shifu that he would never be able to defeat Tai Lung, Tigress took it upon herself to intercept the leopard, and managed to counter most of his attacks. When Po defeats Tai Lung, Tigress is very impressed, and the first to acknowledge him as a master of kung fu.

Tigress' backstory is largely revealed in a series of television specials. In Secrets of the Furious Five, it is revealed that she was an orphan living in the Bao Gu Orphanage, feared by the other children for her temper, and she taught herself control by learning to play dominoes. She was adopted by Shifu, and in Secrets of the Scroll, it is revealed that Shifu disapproved of her aggression and strength, wanting her to emphasize his control and precision. Oogway, on the contrary, encouraged Tigress to grow into her own.

Master Viper
Master Viper (voiced by Lucy Liu in the films and TV series) is a green tree viper with two small lotus flowers on top of her head. Although she was born with ineffective venomous fangs, she compensates with her strength and precision. Viper is the most outwardly compassionate and maternal member of the Five, and is the only one not to mock Po when he first joins the Jade Palace.

In Secrets of the Furious Five, she is revealed to be the daughter of Great Master Viper, who relied on his venomous fangs to protect the village where they lived. The Great Master hoped that his daughter would carry on his legacy, and was distraught at her lack of fangs. Viper instead took up ribbon dancing at a young age, and showed a proficiency for it. When a gorilla bandit came to the Autumn Moon Festival and shattered the Great Master's fangs using venom-proof armor, Viper used her dancing to tie the bandit up in her ribbon. Only then was her father satisfied with his daughter becoming a warrior on her own terms.

Master Monkey
Master Monkey (voiced by Jackie Chan in the films) is a golden snub-nosed monkey with a thick Chinese accent, and the most humorous of the Five. He was the first to recognize Po's determination, and the first to refer to Po by his name. Unlike the other members of the Five, Monkey prefers to use a weapon in combat, and the staff that he uses is associated with the legendary Monkey King Sun Wukong. He is also the second-in-command of the Furious Five.

Monkey has an older brother, Wu Kong, who is the self-proclaimed "King of Thieves," and their mother died from the shock and grief of seeing her sons fight. Nevertheless, Monkey was an adolescent trickster, who humiliated the members of his village with pranks. Oogway put an end to Monkey's trickery, using his shell to hide from his attacks, and the tortoise encouraged Monkey to use his skills for good, putting him on the path to kung fu mastery.

Master Mantis
Master Mantis (voiced by Seth Rogen in the films) is a Chinese mantis and the smallest of the Five. He is, however, the strongest proportional to his size, and can move at superhuman speeds. When Po's girth was cited as a reason why he could not be a kung fu master, Mantis was the first to declare that size did little to define a warrior, and that it could be used to one's advantage.

Master Crane
Master Crane (voiced by David Cross in the films) is a black-necked crane and the most patient of the Five. He serves as a scout and lookout in combat situations, as well as a means of transport for the other members of the Five. Should any of the Five fall from a great height, Crane will appear to break their fall.

Before joining the Five, Crane was the janitor at the Lee Da Kung Fu Academy, where he was looked down upon due to his slender build. However, Mei Ling, the top student, saw the skills that Crane used when cleaning the academy, and convinced him to try out for the school. While his nerve got the better of him at first, Crane soon gained the confidence to pass the obstacle course and gain admission into the academy.

List of Kung Fu Masters
A series of kung fu masters appear in the franchise, many of which only appear in passing within the TV show or comics.

Masters' Council of Gongmen City
The Masters' Council are a group of renowned Kung Fu Masters who are the protectors of the metropolis of Gongmen City. They governed the city after the parents of Lord Shen had passed on.

 Master Thundering Rhino (voiced by Victor Garber in Kung Fu Panda 2, Paul Scheer in Secrets of the Masters) is a Javan rhinoceros and the leader of the Masters' Council that protects Gongmen City. His father is rumored to be the Legendary Master Flying Rhino, and Rhino became legendary in his own right by slaying the Ten Thousand Serpents in the Valley of Woe. He frequently collaborated with Master Ox and Master Croc to subdue threats to China, and used the Cloud Hammer in battle. Rhino was among those first targeted by Lord Shen. When Shen defeats Ox and Croc, Rhino breaks his weapons and warns him that he is no match for kung fu. Shen agrees, but then reveals his cannon. It is implied that the first cannon blast kills Master Rhino off-screen.
 Master Storming Ox (voiced by Dennis Haysbert) is a water buffalo, another Master of Gongmen City and a member of the Masters' Council. He is an expert strategist who was trained by Master Thundering Rhino after sneaking into the Royal Palace. When Shen storms the Palace, Ox is imprisoned in Gongmen City Jail. He initially refuses to join the Five, believing that if he does, Shen will destroy everything, but he changes his mind at Shifu's persuasion. After Shen and Thundering Rhino's death, Master Storming Ox becomes the new leader of the Master's Council, and the new king of Gongmen City.
 Master Croc (voiced by Jean-Claude Van Damme in Kung Fu Panda 2, Tony Leondis in Secrets of the Masters) is a saltwater crocodile, another Master of Gongmen City, and a member of the Masters' Council. He was once the head of the Wool Stealing Crocodile Bandits of Crocodile Island until Master Thundering Rhino convinced him to mend his ways. When Lord Shen attacks the Royal Palace, Master Croc is defeated and imprisoned in Gongmen City Jail.

Other Kung Fu Masters
 Master Flying Rhino (voiced by David Cowgill) is the father and trainer of Thundering Rhino. He also trained Vachir, and recommended him to Oogway as the head of Tai Lung's incarceration at Chorh-Gom Prison. His armor is currently on display in the Hall of Warriors.
 Great Master Viper (voiced by James Sie) is the father of Master Viper and the last known leader of the Viper Clan. He was proud of his use of venomous fangs in combat, and was displeased when his daughter was born without them. He later changed his mind when a gorilla bandit broke his fangs, and his daughter subdued him with her ribbon dancing.
 Master Chao (voiced by James Sie) is a monitor lizard and a member of the Sacred Oryx Council. Displeased with Po and Shifu's disobedience, Chao replaces Shifu with Master Junjie as leader of the Jade Palace. When Junjie reveals his villainy and is subdued by Po, Chao commends the panda for doing the right thing despite the risk.
 Master Yao (voiced by Paul Rugg) is a markhor master known for his intellect. He spent a lifetime meditating alone, bearing no contact with the outside world. When Yao comes out of hiding, he is ecstatic at everything surrounding him. Despite his lack of physical strength, Yao uses his mental abilities to knock the Qidan Clan unconscious.
 Mrs. Gow (voiced by Amy Hill) is an elderly goat and former kung fu master, known as Gow of the Hundred Stars. When Mr. Ping suggests that Mrs. Gow and Mr. Yeung help defend the Jade Palace, Po dismisses them on account of their age, but Gow proves her worth.
 Master Shengqi (voiced by Tim Dadabo) is a water buffalo who was falsely imprisoned for protecting his daughter Xiao Niao from Duke Pingjun when she accidentally ruined the latter's giant moon cake. He breaks out of prison and has a bounty placed on him. Po doesn't believe his story until he sees Shengqi wearing half of Xiao Niao's necklace. When Constable Hu is told the truth, he reverses Shengqi's sentence.
 Master Kweng (voiced by Jim Meskimen) is a goat and the CEO of Kung Fu Express, a group of messenger-warriors. He nearly creates a war between the Gorilla Clans when he takes a peace treaty with the Dragon Warrior's autograph.
 Master Mugan (voiced by April Winchell) is a goldfish and the master of Garnet Palace. She dislikes Po for his lack of discipline, and is possessive over her students. Mugan chooses Tigress for the new master of the Garnet Palace, and is trapped there until Po and Wu Yong trap her in her tank.
 Master Elephant (voiced by Nolan North) is an Indian elephant and an original member of the original Furious Five, along with Shifu, Fenghuang, Master Snow Leopard, and Master Rooster. When Po teams up with the original five to retrieve the Sword of Xi'an, Master Elephant is possessed by the owner of the blade and is freed by both the current and past incarnations of the Five.

Villains

Film Villains

Tai Lung
Tai Lung (voiced by Ian McShane in the films, Andre Sogliuzzo in the television series) is the main antagonist of Kung Fu Panda. He is a muscular snow leopard with supernatural strength. Shifu's adopted son, Tai Lung was the only student to be taught the Nerve Attack, and he believed that his destiny was to become the Dragon Warrior. When Oogway sensed the darkness in Tai Lung's heart and refused him the title, he felt betrayed and laid siege to the city and overwhelmed Shifu in combat  to try to claim the scroll, only to be finally defeated at the hands of Master Oogway. After his defeat, Tai Lung was sent to Chorh-Gom Prison for twenty years as a result of his crimes.

When Zeng arrives at the prison to order an increase in security, Tai Lung uses one of the goose's fallen feathers to pick the locks on his restraints and escape. He defeats the Furious Five in battle and storms the Jade Palace in search of the Dragon Scroll. In his hunt for the scroll, he overpowers Shifu and nearly kills him, but Po lures him away with the dragon scroll, sparking a brutal confrontation between the two. After Po is momentarily stunned, he finally sees the Scroll, but does not understand the symbolism of its blank, reflective surface (there is no secret to ultimate power, it all depends in yourself). Tai Lung is ultimately decimated when Po utilizes the Wuxi Finger Hold on him. In Kung Fu Panda 3, it's explained that the Finger Hold sends its opponent to the Spirit Realm, indicating that Tai Lung now resides there. After his defeat, he continues to be seen in flashback sequences. He is also one of the kung fu masters in the Spirit Realm defeated by Kai and whose chi was collected by this latter.

Tai Lung's name is Cantonese for "Great Dragon" (大龍 daai6 lung4), which was inspired from that of the protagonist from T'ai Fu: Wrath of the Tiger (a game developed by DreamWorks Interactive before the release of the first film), whose name is a play on another Cantonese vocabulary containing a similar meaning.

Lord Shen
Lord Shen (voiced by Gary Oldman) is a leucistic peacock warlord and  the main antagonist of Kung Fu Panda 2. He was originally a prince of Gongmen City who became interested in gunpowder, wondering if it could be used for warfare. His parents, worried by his obsession, visited the Soothsayer, who told them that if he continued too far down this path, he would be stopped by "a warrior of black and white." Shen, eavesdropping on this conversation, deduces that the warrior in question would be a panda, and led his wolf guards into a massacre against the giant panda population to avert the prophecy. He was subsequently disowned by his parents and exiled from the family palace. Feeling resentful over his exile, Shen is obsessed with taking over China with his gunpowder based weapons.

Thirty years later, Shen returns to Gongmen City with an arsenal of cannons. He summons the Masters' Council to a duel, where he defeats Storming Ox and Croc, and kills Thundering Rhino with a cannonball shot. He initially thinks Po a simpleton and not the warrior of prophecy, but comes to fear him and attempts to kill him with a cannon blast. Po returns, having been nursed back to health by the Soothsayer and having achieved inner peace, and redirects the cannonballs fired at him, destroying Shen's fleet. In spite of Po's attempts to convince him to let go of the past and find peace, Shen rejects this and furiously attacks Po with his cold weapons. When the resulting melee cuts the ropes keeping the cannon wreckage from falling, Shen after a moment of shock refuses to move out of the way and accepts his death, and is crushed to death by the weapon while Po narrowly escapes the resulting explosion.

Wolf Boss
The Wolf Boss (voiced by Danny McBride) is an unnamed wolf who is the leader of Lord Shen's wolf army.

Kai
Kai (voiced by J. K. Simmons) is a bull and the main antagonist of Kung Fu Panda 3. He was originally a friend and brother-in-arms to Grand Master Oogway, and was taught how to use chi by the pandas of the Secret Panda Village. Kai became power-hungry with the knowledge, and learned how to take chi from other rather than give it, forcing Oogway to banish him to the Spirit Realm. Kai spent the next five hundred years collecting the chi of every kung fu master who ended up in the Spirit Realm before challenging Oogway to a duel, successfully overpowering him and absorbing his chi, allowing him to come back to the world of the living.

Kai and his jade warriors begin assaulting the Mortal World upon their arrival and begins stealing the chi of the living kung fu masters, including all members of the Furious Five but Tigress, who escapes to warn Po of his coming. When Kai and his "Jombies" reach the Secret Panda Village, Po attempts to use the Wuxi Finger Hold on him, but it does not work on a spirit. Po instead uses the move on himself to bring both of them back to the Spirit Realm. While he temporarily gains the upper hand against Po and almost absorbs him, he is soon overpowered when Po is empowered with the Chi of the inhabitants of the panda Village along with Tigress and Mr. Ping. Ultimately, Po overloads Kai with chi, triggering a spiritual explosion that obliterates Kai and freeing all the masters whose chi he had stolen.

Wu Sisters
Su Wu, Wing Wu, and Wan Wu (voiced by Sumalee Montano in Secrets of the Masters) are a trio of snow leopard sisters appearing in Secrets of the Masters. Once the sisters escaped prison, where they were kept for a series of crimes, they set out to unite the various crime families of China, which prompted Oogway to form an alliance with Thundering Rhino, Storming Ox, and Croc in order to defeat them. The Wu sisters also appear as an enemy team in Kung Fu Panda: The Game, and as minions of Tai Lung in Legendary Warriors.

Boar
Boar (voiced by Jayden Lund) is the main antagonist of Kung Fu Panda: Secrets of the Scroll. A renowned warrior, Shifu intended to stop him, but was bedridden due to accidental food poisoning, and Tigress went in his place. When mimicking Shifu's style of combat, Tigress initially faltered, but when the rest of the Five came to her aid, Tigress abandoned Shifu's kung fu style in favor of her own, and managed to defeat him. Boar's attack and subsequent defeat inspired the creation of the Furious Five, and the story of their triumph sparked Po's love of kung fu.

Comic villains
 Kuo is a Tibetan antelope who appears in the comic "Art of Balance." He initially appears to be a fan of Mr. Ping's noodles, but soon reveals himself to be a restaurant owner who went out of business because of Ping's popularity. Kuo blames Mr. Ping for making him a failure, but Po tells Kuo that he simply lost his balance.
 Qinchu is a Tibetan fox who appears in the comic "Special Delivery." The self-elected official of Mount Penglai, Qinchu hijacked a series of mail carts in search for the key to the city, which was passed from one location to another so that its exact whereabouts were always a mystery. Qinchu planned to use the key to lock the gates and isolate the city, but Po vanquishes him and leaves him to his angry citizens.
 The Five Elements Imposters appear in the comic "It's Elemental." They take advantage of a prophecy that one day, the Five Elements would take physical forms and become the ultimate protectors of the world. Po discovered the charade, and uncovered that the group used sesame oil, hidden containers, and concealed weapons to mimic the Five Elements.

Television villains
 Scorpion (voiced by Lynn Milgrim) is a mutated scorpion. She was once the best healer in the Valley of Peace, until she injected herself with a hypnosis potion and kept the villagers under her spell for many years. Oogway breaks the spell and exiles her, but Scorpion steals the last sun orchid, a cure for river fever. When Po and Monkey hunt for the cure to Tigress' river fever, they find Scorpion, who hypnotizes Monkey before ultimately being defeated.
 Fung (voiced by John DiMaggio) is a mugger crocodile and the leader of a group of Crocodile Bandits. He is a recurring antagonist in Kung Fu Panda: Legends of Awesomeness, although he occasionally mends his ways for the sake of his family.
 Gahri (voiced by Fred Tatasciore) is a mugger crocodile and the second-in-command of Fung's bandit gang. Despite being clumsy and apologetic, he does show great skill in battle, particularly with an axe. His name is usually mispronounced as "Gary" by Fung. He leaves the bandits in the episode "The Break Up" and gets a job at Ping's Noodle Shop.
 Lidong (voiced by Jim Cummings) is a saltwater crocodile and Fung's younger cousin. He was originally a runt, and became proud of his size and strength after a growth burst. As such, he is enraged by anyone of a larger size than he is. In "Huge," Mantis uses a magic potion to reduce Lidong to a fraction of his size.
 Temutai (voiced by Kevin Michael Richardson) is a water buffalo and the Warrior-King of the Qidan Clan. He has claimed to have beaten every kung fu master in the land, and appears as a recurring antagonist in Kung Fu Panda: Legends of Awesomeness. 
 Jing Mei (voiced by Kevin Michael Richardson) is a water buffalo, member of the Qidan Clan, and Temutai's nephew. In "The Kung Fu Kid," Temutai enters Jing Mei into the children's kung fu competition, where he is defeated by Peng.
 Taotie (voiced by Wallace Shawn) is a common warthog and recurring antagonist in Kung Fu Panda: Legends of Awesomeness. He is a mechanic who built the training hall for the Furious Five, and he used to train with Master Shifu. Taotie had a falling-out with Shifu and Oogway about the use of machines to surpass kung fu, and he vowed to get revenge. Taotie frequently uses automated machines such as iron claws or moving figurines to attack the Five.
 Bian-Zao (voiced by Simon Helberg) is a common warthog and the 13-year-old son of Taotie, a reluctant helper in his father's plans. He assists Taotie with the construction of his revenge plots, but often feels guilt about it.
 Jong Sung Jai Kai Chow (voiced by Wayne Knight) is a takin and the ruler of a portion of land that looks poorly upon trespassers. Fung tricks Po into helping him break into Jong's castle to abduct the ruler's son, who Fung claims is his brother. When Jong's guards go to the Jade Palace and tell Shifu that they saw Po aid in the abduction, Po is nearly killed under the trespasser's penalty.
 Tong Fo (voiced by Jeff Bennett) is a slow loris and a crime lord once known for holding the Sacred Hammer of Lei Lang. He was imprisoned for the destruction he caused with the hammer, but hid the weapon in Camelback Mountain before his incarceration.
 Fenghuang (voiced by Wendie Malick) is a Eurasian eagle-owl and a member of the previous Furious Five, alongside Shifu, Master Snow Leopard, Master Rooster, and Master Elephant. The strongest member of the original Five, Fenghuang became power-hungry, and challenged Oogway to a fight for the palace. She eventually flees for the Northern Mountains, but returns upon hearing of Oogway's death. Po pretends to have turned against Master Shifu to earn Fenghuang's trust before placing her in the cage Oogway once created for her.
 Master Junjie (voiced by Stephen Root) is a red fox and a member of the Sacred Oryx Council. He holds a grudge against Master Shifu, who was chosen over Master Junjie to run the Jade Palace, and he believes Po unworthy of the Dragon Warrior mantle.
 Hundun (voiced by Diedrich Bader) is a Javan rhinoceros who speaks in Tautology and a former member of the Anvil of Heaven at Chorh-Gom Prison. When the prison was closed down after Tai Lung's escape, Hundun was left without a job, and blamed his failures on the Dragon Warrior.
 Bao (voiced by Fred Tatasciore) is a pig who, along with his accomplices Lao and Tsao, attack Mr. Ping's noodle shop. After being defeated, they decide they want to learn kung fu and kidnap Mr. Ping, who they mistook for Master Shifu.
 Su (voiced by Amy Hill) is a snow leopard and the leader of the Ladies of the Shade, a group of thieves who distract their targets through parasol dancing. Su assigns Song to get close to Po and enable the Ladies to enter the Jade Palace. Once inside, they steal the Dragon Chalice and escape to their campsite. Song turns against Su and helps to defeat her, taking over the Ladies.
 Wu Kong (voiced by James Sie) is a golden snub-nosed monkey, the older brother of Master Monkey, and the self-proclaimed Prince of Thieves. He has a strained relationship with his brother. Wu Kong appears in the episode "Monkey in the Middle," where he comes to the Valley of Peace to go on a crime spree across the village market.
 Meng Tao (voiced by Jim Meskimen) is a Tibetan antelope and the diplomat to the Emperor of China. When Po makes a rash vow to train the emperor's grandson in kung fu, the antelope informs him that breaking the vow would result in beheading every member of the Jade Palace. It was revealed that he wanted Lu Kang to fail, knowing that disgrace to the emperor's family would allow him to take the throne. Lu Kang, however, is successfully trained and manages to defeat Meng Tao in combat.
 General Tsin (voiced by R. Lee Ermey) is a yak who is a hunter and a retired war hero. Unhappy with his retirement, Tsin begins "collecting" villains around the Valley of Peace, subjecting them to stiffening Zu Chao Powder. Po evades the powder and frees the villains, who willingly team up with Po to get revenge. He later returned where he was hunting a Qilin.
 The Undertaker (voiced by Christopher McDonald) is a goat and the property caretaker of the local cemetery. In "The Po Who Cried Ghost," it is revealed that he has been using a mystical staff to raise an army of Jiangshi. Po snatches the staff and orders the Jiangshi to return to the earth and be at peace.
 Ke-Pa (voiced by Alfred Molina) is a dragon-like demon and the leader of all the demons from the Underworld, who was subdued by Oogway and the power of the Peach Tree. He takes the mortal guise of a Taihu pig and begins to gain his power back as the Peach Tree dies. Po is nearly killed when his Hero's Chi is stolen, but his powers are regained by a sapling that Shifu planted at the end of the first film and he uses his power to defeat Ke-Pa.
 Master Ding (voiced by Enn Reitel) is a pig and a former kung fu master who used his spirit orbs to commit psychic attacks on innocent victims. When Po and Tigress accidentally release Ding's spirit orbs, they have to battle Ding's ghost.
 Heilang (voiced by Maurice LaMarche) is the leader of the Lin Kuei, a group of wolf assassins and thieves. Trained from birth to steal expensive and powerful artifacts from Kung Fu masters, Heilang and the Lin Kuei attempt to steal the Phantom Orb and the Shadow Crown, two artifacts which make the wearer intangible or invisible. Both times, they are defeated by members of the Furious Five.
 Pai Mei (voiced by Clancy Brown) is an emperor tamarin and a rogue kung fu master. He was exiled by Master Shifu after attempting to overpower the emperor, but reappears in "Five is Enough." The Five defeat him, and Pai Mei is last seen falling off of a cliff.
 Mei Ling (voiced by Susanne Blakeslee) is a female red fox, not to be confused with the snow leopard of the same name. A rogue kung fu master, Mei Ling was also Shifu's love interest until she refused to stop using her skills for thievery. Despite this, Shifu still harbors feelings for Mei Ling, and they reconnect after her redemption in "Crazy Little Ling Called Love."
 Kira Kozu (voiced by Tohoru Masamune) is a clam and former samurai who betrayed Yijiro and the Ishida Clan, becoming a Rōnin with plans to take over Japan. Po defeats Kira using the samurai methods taught to him by Yijiro.
 Fu-xi (voiced by Dwight Schultz) is a king cobra named after the Chinese deity. Once a famous hero, Fu-Xi felt betrayed by the "two-leggers," and attempted to recruit Master Viper to fight alongside him.
 Sanzu (voiced by John Kassir) is a Chinese pangolin and the greedy caretaker of a group of orphans, who he organized into stealing for him. Po freed the orphans from Sanzu's control and placed them in the care of Mrs. Yoon.
 Ju-Long (voiced by Paul Reubens) is a brown rat and the leader of the Lao Shu, a band of renegade rats, described by Master Shifu as "deadly and unbalanced." His diminutive size allows him to evade larger opponents. In "The Hunger Game," Ju-Long collaborated with Madame Zhao to steal food from the Valley of Peace, only to be betrayed by her and imprisoned with Po.
 Madame Zhao (voiced by Gaille Heidemann) is a gazelle who tricked Po into visiting her if he ever needed food. She uses this to imprison him in an underground room, but was vanquished by Po and Ju-Long.

List of supporting characters

Mr. Ping
Mr. Ping (voiced by James Hong) is a Chinese goose and the owner of the most popular noodle shop in the Valley of Peace. He adopted Po when he found a baby panda in one of the shop's radish crate deliveries. Ping worries about Po, especially in his continued development as a kung fu master, but is the one to tell him that things are special if someone believes them to be.

Po and Mr. Ping's relationship becomes strained when Po learns that his biological father, Li Shan, is still alive, but he comes to realize that having Li Shan in Po's life does not mean less for him, but more for Po.

James Hong is the only voice actor to reprise his role as Mr. Ping in the films, television series, and video games.

Li Shan
Li Shan (voiced by Fred Tatasciore in Kung Fu Panda 2 and Bryan Cranston in Kung Fu Panda 3) is a giant panda, and the biological father of Po. He was separated from his son when Lord Shen's wolf army attacked their village, and was presumed dead with the other pandas. At the end of Kung Fu Panda 2, he is revealed to be alive and hiding in a secret refuge. In the third film, Li and Po reunite, and Li convinces his son to stay with the other pandas. He lies about knowing chi in order to prevent Po from leaving, but when Kai turns most of the masters into jade warriors, Li is part of the panda army that resists.

Shirong
Shirong (voiced by Malcolm McDowell) is a red panda and the father of Master Shifu. A con artist by trade, Shirong used his son as a shill before abandoning him at the Jade Palace. In the Legends of Awesomeness episode "Father Crime," Shirong stages a kidnapping in order to reconnect with his son, but Shifu is captured by Tong Fo in the process. Shirong, along with Po and Tigress, helps to free his son, and the two end on good terms.

Zeng
Zeng (voiced by Dan Fogler) is a swan goose and a messenger of Master Shifu. Ironically, while he is given the mission to double the amount of guards at Chorh-Gom Prison and prevent Tai Lung's escape, Tai Lung uses one of Zeng's fallen feathers to pick the lock on his restraints and escape. Zeng is spared in the resulting prison break, but is forced to return to the valley and herald Tai Lung's escape. His role in the film is a reflection of Oogway's proverb that "one often meets destiny on the road he takes to avoid it."

Vachir
Commander Vachir (voiced by Michael Clarke Duncan) is a Javan rhinoceros, the chief of security at Chorh-Gom Prison, and the leader of the Anvil of Heaven, an army of elite battle rhinos. Prior to Tai Lung's incarceration, the Anvil opposed tyranny and injustice throughout China. Vachir was tasked with the construction of the prison, and personally oversaw Tai Lung's imprisonment for twenty years. When Tai Lung made his escape, Vachir was caught in an explosion with many of his troops and his prosthetic ruby horn-shaped cap is seen amongst the ruins, though it is unknown if he was killed.

Mei Ling
Mei Ling (voiced by Stephanie Lemelin) is an Asian golden cat and the star student at the Lee Da Kung Fu Academy, where Crane worked as a janitor. After seeing his graceful movements, she urged him to enroll as a student. When Crane's first attempt at the induction challenge was mocked, Mei Ling felt as if she was responsible for exposing Crane to public humiliation, but he recovered with a strong obstacle course performance and was admitted to the academy.

Wo Hop
Wo Hop (voiced by Jack McBrayer) is a rabbit and a renowned chef who auditioned for the honor to cook for the Kung Fu Masters Winter Festival banquet. Po, unfamiliar with the intricate customs of the selection process, inadvertently disgraced Wo Hop while waving to Monkey, and the chef became desperate to redeem himself through his own death. Po contained the rabbit and helped him complete a meal for the banquet. After the meal was complete, Po presented Hop with the Golden Ladle, the intended honor for the official cook of the feast, which restored Wo Hop's honor.

Soothsayer
The Soothsayer (voiced by Michelle Yeoh) is an elderly cashmere goat and Shen's former nanny, who foretold the peacock's doom. She also aids Po, treating him with acupuncture and a herbal mixture after his presumed death. The Soothsayer knows what Shen did to Po's village, and helps Po stop fighting his memories in order to achieve inner peace.

Peng
Peng (voiced by Danny Cooksey) is a snow leopard and the nephew of Tai Lung. He leaves his life as an assistant potter to become a self-taught prodigy in the martial arts, which brings him to the Jade Palace. Peng shows a great aptitude for the martial arts, but needs help reining in his temper. Po reveals to Peng the kind of character Tai Lung was in order to stop the leopard from avenging his uncle. He later creates a Kung Fu Fight Club, teaching citizens how to defend themselves.

Song
Song (voiced by Lauren Tom) is a young snow leopard and a member of the Ladies of the Shade, a group of bandits who distract their marks with parasol dancing. Su, the leader of the Ladies, tasks Song with charming Po into allowing the gang to enter the Jade Palace. As she talks to him, Song begins to like Po, and is about to tell him the truth of her origin when Su arrives and asks if the ladies can spend the night in the Palace. When the Ladies abscond with the dragon chalice, Po follows them to their campsite, and rejects Song's apology. Nevertheless, when Su and the other Ladies find Po, Song protects him, and she becomes the leader of the group after Su's defeat.

Constable Hu
Constable Hu (voiced by Neil Ross) is an Indian elephant and recurring character in Kung Fu Panda: Legends of Awesomeness. He is largely stoic and focused on his job. In "The Midnight Stranger," he outlaws the practice of kung fu, a decision later revealed to be forced upon him by the pig criminals.

Grandma Panda
Grandma Panda (voiced by Barbara Dirikson) is an old female panda. She loves to be happy, take a walk and spend time with her grandson. At the end of Kung Fu Panda 3, she hugs her grandson with the others after Po destroyed Kai.

Characters exclusive to the video games

Appearing in Kung Fu Panda: The Video Game
Kung Fu Panda: The Video Game is a PlayStation 3 and Xbox 360 release loosely based on the film of the same name. In it, Tai Lung recruits a series of gangs and bandits to aid him after escaping from Chor-Gom Prison.

 Blackhoof Boar Clan Leader (voiced by Bill Farmer) - A boar who is the leader of the Blackhoof Boar Clan.
 Queen Crocodile (voiced by Susan Blakeslee) - A mugger crocodile and the leader of the Imperial Golden Croc Gang, she is accidentally awakened when Po and Master Crane rescue the last remaining tortoise egg, and sends her husband, the Crocodile Sergeant after them.
 Crocodile Sergeant - A mugger crocodile who is the husband of the Queen Crocodile and leader of the Imperial Gold Croc Gang.
 Great Gorilla (voiced by Phil Morris) - A large mountain gorilla and the leader of a gang of gorillas. Following Great Gorilla's defeat, remnants of his gang worked with the Lang Shadow Army.
 Lang Shadow Army - An army of Tibetan wolves that served Tai Lung prior to his defeat and incarceration. When Tai Lung escaped from Chor-Gom Prison, the Lang Shadow Army came out of hiding and assisted their master once again. They were later joined by the remnants of Great Gorilla's gang and two ox mercenaries.

Appearing in Kung Fu Panda: Legendary Warriors
Kung Fu Panda: Legendary Warriors is the sequel to the 2008 video game, and similarly includes a series of boss battles against the leaders of gangs recruited by Tai Lung in his quest for revenge.

 Rat Boss (voiced by S. Scott Bullock) - A rat and the leader of the Black Moon Scavenger Clan.
 Great General Ox - An ox and the leader of the Hoof Clan.
 Baboon Boss (voiced by Fred Tatasciore) - The leader of a gang of baboons.
 Gorilla Boss (voiced by Daran Norris) - The leader of a gang of gorillas.

Appearing in Kung Fu Panda 2: The Video Game
 Zhou Dan is the leader of a gang of komodo dragons. Following the defeat of Lord Shen, he takes advantage of the chaos caused by the remnants of Shen's wolf and gorilla armies and attempts to take over Gongmen City.

References

Kung Fu Panda
Lists of animated film characters
Animated characters by series
Lists of fictional animals in animation
Lists of fictional animals by work
Fictional Shaolin kung fu practitioners
Animated characters
Universal Pictures cartoons and characters